Gotta may refer to:

 Jack Gotta (1929–2013), American-born Canadian football player, coach and manager
 Zamir Gotta, Russian film producer
 Gotta Barrage, on the Vamsadhara River, Odisha and Andhra Pradesh states, India